Stephan Greeff (born 24 December 1989 in Cape Town) is a South African rugby union player who last played for the  in the Pro14. His regular playing position is lock.

Career

Youth and Varsity rugby

Greeff represented the Eastern Province Country Districts side at the 2007 Under-18 Academy Week competition before moving to Cape Town to join . He played for the  side in 2008 and for the  side in 2009 and 2010.

Western Province

He made another three appearances in that competition, as well as one in the 2011 Vodacom Cup and another in a compulsory friendly match against  prior to the 2011 Currie Cup Premier Division.

Lions / Golden Lions

He made one more start (against the ), as well as three substitute appearances. He also made one appearance for the Golden Lions in the 2012 Vodacom Cup, but then suffered a leg fracture, which ruled him out of the remainder of the season.

Pumas

External links

References

Living people
1989 births
South African rugby union players
Golden Lions players
Lions (United Rugby Championship) players
Western Province (rugby union) players
Leopards (rugby union) players
Rugby union players from Cape Town
People from the Western Cape
Rugby union locks
Afrikaner people
Southern Kings players
Griquas (rugby union) players
Pumas (Currie Cup) players
Eastern Province Elephants players